Alice Little (born May 3, 1990) is an Irish-American sex worker and YouTuber. Her stage name, Alice Little, refers to her height, which is 4'8", making her the "shortest legal escort" in Nevada, and consequently, in the United States.

Little gained attention in 2017 after she wrote an article for Refinery 29 entitled "A Week as a Legal Sex Worker in Mound House, NV, on a $267,000 Salary." She has since become known for her advocacy for sex workers. In 2019, she received further press for offering a 50% discount for attendees of Alienstock Festival.

When not working, Little resides in Carson City, Nevada.

Early years 
Little was born "just outside of Dublin," Ireland and moved to the U.S. when she was five years old. Little grew up in Nassau County, Long Island, New York.
 
Before joining the legal sex work industry, she was a jockey at Belmont Stakes and an emergency medical technician in New York, New York.

Luxury companion career 
Little has been in the legal sex work industry since November 2015 when she started work at the Sagebrush Ranch, then moved on to the Moonlite BunnyRanch in October 2017. In May 2021, Little moved to the Chicken Ranch due to its location in the first Nevada county to announce brothels were allowed to reopen since the start of the COVID-19 Pandemic. Little runs workshops for the other sex workers at the ranch, focusing on business management.

Sex education career 
Little, who began her work in sex-positive careers as a BDSM sex educator, continues to produce videos for her YouTube channel with content focused on sex education. She has a seasonal series called Coffee with Alice. In this series of videos she discusses "different intimacy topics" and answers audience questions. Little also produces three other series for her channel, Ask A Sex Worker, Sex Toy Reviews, and (S)explained! An additional series, Bunny Ranch, was completed in April 2019.
 
In addition to her YouTube channel, she also writes sex education articles and opinion pieces for a variety of publications, including HuffPost, Business Insider, HuffPost United Kingdom, Yahoo! News, SheKnows, Insider Inc., Refinery29, The Reno Gazette-Journal, The Nevada Independent, and Guys Gab.

Advocacy 
She is a founding member of Hookers for Healthcare and an active member of the Nevada Brothel Association. She is an activist for Sex workers' rights; she has fought to counteract legislation to have sex work criminalized, such as by FOSTA-SESTA, and to keep the brothels of Nevada from closing down by 2018's proposed law Lyon County Question 1.

Personal life 
Little is bisexual and a proponent of consensual non-monogamy.  Little has an antiquarian rare book collection.

References

External links 
 
 Alice Little - Official YouTube Channel
 Nevada Brothel Association
 Alice Little's Muck Rack profile

1990 births
Living people
LGBT YouTubers
American prostitutes
American YouTubers
Irish female prostitutes
Irish YouTubers
Bisexual prostitutes
Irish emigrants to the United States
People from Reno, Nevada
People from County Dublin
People from Carson City, Nevada
Irish bisexual people
American bisexual people
20th-century Irish LGBT people
21st-century Irish LGBT people
20th-century American LGBT people
21st-century American LGBT people
Sex educators